The Swabian-Hall swine (Schwäbisch-Hällische Landschwein) is a breed of domestic pig originating from Schwäbisch Hall in Baden-Württemberg, Germany.  It is a large pig, white in the centre with a black head and rear and narrow grey bands at the transition from white to black skin. They have large litters averaging more than nine piglets.

History 

The nickname is Mohrenköpfle. The breed was started by King William I, who imported Meishan pigs from  China in 1820/21 to crossbreed with the German Landrace with the idea of increasing the fat content. This crossbreeding with the "Chinese pigs" was particularly successful within the stocks of domestic pigs in the Hohenlohe region and the area around the town of Schwäbisch Hall.

The breed proved popular and by 1959 totaled 90% of pigs in Baden-Württemberg. However, their popularity declined in the 1960s with the markets preferring leaner pork with less fat than the Swabian-Hall could offer. The breed was kept going in small numbers by enthusiastic farmers in the Hohenlohe district, although numbers were down to only seven breeding sows and two boars by 1984. The breed today has a high reputation amongst gourmets, having a darker meat and strong, distinctive flavour. Since 1998, Swabian-Hall pork (Schwäbisch-Hällisches Qualitätsschweinfleisch) is a name with Protected Geographical Status in the European Union; only pigs coming from the Swabian Hall, Hohenlohe, and some adjacent districts can be sold under that name. There are now only around 1500 sows registered to this breed. All of these are from farms belonging to the Farmer Producer Association of Swabian Hall (Bäuerliche Erzeugergemeinschaft Schwäbisch Hall), who implement an inspection regime which strictly controls the quality of feed given to the animals. The Swabian-Hall Breeders Association (Züchtervereinigung Schwäbisch Hällisches Schwein) was formed (2077) before the Producers Association (1607) but the farmer is now a subsidiary of the latter.

Parade   Cannstatter Volksfest
Traditionally a parade also takes place at the Wasen.The most important activities of the festival had been the award for breeding performance and the display of agricultural efficiency of the Württemberg farmers. The crossbreeding of  Hohenlohe region and the area around the town of Schwäbisch Hall, the Mohrenköpfle is a pig in the parade . There are still groups in traditional clothes, which have taken part in the festival since 1841. No Piercings und Tattoos. Women: no long open hairs.

Stuttgart, the state capital of Baden Württemberg, will celebrate a quite special double jubilee together with the federal state in 2018 – 200 years Cannstatter Volksfest and the 100th “Landwirtschaftliches Hauptfest” – by holding a Historical Volksfest in the heart of the city.

Gallery

References

Pig breeds originating in Germany
Animal breeds on the GEH Red List